Nigel Gregory Benn (born 22 January 1964) is a British former professional boxer who competed from 1987 to 1996. He held world championships in two weight classes, including the WBO middleweight title in 1990 and the WBC super-middleweight title from 1992 to 1996. At the regional level, he held the Commonwealth middleweight title from 1988 to 1989. 

Nicknamed " The Dark Destroyer" for his formidable punching power and aggressive fighting style, Benn retired with a 83.3% knockout ratio. His best-known fights include the successful world middleweight title defence against Iran Barkley in 1989; the two all-British world title contests against Chris Eubank in 1990 and 1993 (Nigel Benn vs. Chris Eubank), and the successful—but tragic—defence of his world super-middleweight title against Gerald McClellan in 1995 (Nigel Benn vs. Gerald McClellan). In the build to his ring walks, Big Ben would often chime before he made his entrance to music.

Early years and amateur career
Benn was born in Ilford, East London, on 22 January 1964. Benn joined the British Army Royal Fusiliers at the age of 18. He was stationed in West Germany for three years, and then in Northern Ireland for eighteen months. On leaving the army, Benn joined West Ham Amateur Boxing Club.

Amateur accomplishments
1986 Amateur Boxing Association Middleweight Champion.

Professional career
Benn's professional in 1987 and began a streak of 22 consecutive knockout wins. During this time, Benn won the vacant Commonwealth middleweight title with a second-round win over Abdul Umaru, at Alexandra Pavilion on 20 April 1988. 

in May 1989 Benn (22-0, 22 KOs) lost his Commonwealth title against Michael Watson in a heavily anticipated bout at Finsbury Park, London (Nigel Benn vs. Michael Watson). The fight appeared on national television in the US . In the sixth round, Watson knocked Benn down with a jab and Benn was counted out as he rose to his feet . 

His next fight against Jorge Amparo in Atlantic City, U.S. was his first fight abroad and the first to last the full distance, with Benn winning a 10-round decision.

WBO middleweight champion 

After two more wins, against Sanderline Williams and Jose Quinones, Benn fought WBO middleweight title holder Doug DeWitt of the US in Atlantic City. Benn was knocked down in round two, but came back to knock DeWitt down in round three. Benn scored three knockdowns in round eight to win the title.

His first defence came in August 1990 against former WBC champion Iran Barkley. Benn won via the three-knockdown rule at the end of the first round. Benn returned to the UK and met British rival Chris Eubank three months later. They fought in Birmingham on 18 November 1990. Benn lost his title to Eubank in the ninth round after the referee stepped in and declared a win for Eubank via Technical knockout.

WBC super-middleweight champion 
Beginning in 1991 with a seventh-round KO victory over Robbie Sims(Marvin Hagler's half-brother), Benn went on a winning streak of six fights leading to another world title challenge. Other noteworthy wins in this period include a disputed decision win against Thulani Malinga and a one-punch KO victory against Dan Sherry.

On 10 October 1992, Benn successfully challenged Mauro Galvano for the WBC super-middleweight title in Palaghiaccio de Marino, Marino, Lazio, Italy. Galvano was unable to continue in the third due to a severe cut, and--after a controversial dispute at ringside over the official result--Benn was declared the winner by technical decision.

While still a dangerous and damaging puncher, Benn's move to the higher weight limit saw him refine his fight strategy and adopt a more considered approach. The aggression remained but he relied less on one-punch knockout power and became a more effective, and adaptable fighter. He defended his title against fellow Britons Nicky Piper and Lou Gent, and a rematch victory over Mauro Galvano, before again Chris Eubank—who was now WBO super-middleweight champion—in a unification bout on 9 October 1993. The bout ended in a draw, with both fighters retaining their respective titles. Benn defended his title twice more in 1994 with unanimous decisions against Henry Wharton and Juan Carlos Giminez Ferreyra.

Benn vs McClellan

In February 1995, Benn successfully defended his 168  lb title against WBC middleweight champion Gerald McClellan in a highly anticipated bout billed as Sudden Impact. Going into the fight McClellan had won his last 21 fights—the last 14 of those by knockout; with 13 of those knockouts in the first three Rounds. McClellan had twice defeated the renowned power-puncher Julian Jackson, with knockouts in Round 5 and Round 1 respectively. McClellan had never been beyond Round 8 in any of his previous fights, insisting that he rarely needed more than three rounds to defeat his opponents .

Round 1 saw Benn knocked through the ropes as McClellan asserted himself in dominant fashion and looked to be good to his word. Benn was forced to hang on and fight his way to survival in the early rounds of the contest, which developed into a brutal war between. Benn forced his control of the contest's momentum in Rounds 4–6 as McClellan began to act increasingly out of sorts, struggling to keep his gumshield in his mouth and backing off for prolonged periods while blinking repetitively. In an apparent change in fortunes, McClellan then struck back in Rounds 7 and 8, knocking Benn down again in the eighth. However, a now clearly exhausted and drained McClellan was unable to follow up as Benn rallied to stop McClellan in Round 10 by KO, with McClellan unable to rise from his knee. At the time of the stoppage, two judges had McClellan ahead, the other had the fight even. Although, these scores are from the end of Round 9, and do not reflect the two knockdowns scored by Benn in the tenth.

McClellan was severely injured as a result of the contest. After collapsing in his corner post-fight, McClellan was rushed to hospital where a blood clot was discovered on his brain. To this day McClellan has bad short-term memory problems, is almost completely blind, partially deaf, and uses a wheelchair. Although he has regained some movement and some of his hearing since 1995, having been 80% deaf and he can now walk with a cane. In 2007, McClellan, his sister and his children attended a benefit dinner organised and hosted by Benn to help McClellan with his ongoing medical expenses.

After his fight with McClellan, Benn had two further successful title defences, with wins against future WBC title-holder Vincenzo Nardiello and American Danny Perez. Benn then lost his title to Malinga in 1996 in a fight that saw Benn knock Malinga down in the fifth round, but in which he also met the canvass in the twelfth. Benn lost the contest by a split decision (118-109, 115-111, 112-114).

Benn vs Collins I and II
In 1996, Benn attempted to take the WBO super-middleweight title twice from Steve Collins—who had taken that particular title from Eubank and beat him in a rematch. Benn failed in both attempts. In the first fight, he lost by TKO in Round 4 after sustaining an ankle injury.  In the rematch four months later, Benn was retired by his corner at the end of Round 6 with Benn on his stool. Benn retired from professional boxing altogether shortly after the fight.

Return from retirement

On 24 September 2019, Benn announced his return to boxing at the age of 55 after 23 years of being out of the ring. Benn reasoned that he wanted "closure" after the unsatisfactory end to his boxing career in 1996 as he announced a forthcoming bout with former WBC super-middleweight world champion Sakio Bika (34-7-3) that was planned to take place on 23 November 2019. The British Boxing Board of Control refused to sanction the fight, which instead was to be somewhat controversially sanctioned by the British and Irish Boxing Authority. However, the fight was subsequently called off when Benn suffered a shoulder injury in sparring. A disappointed Benn reluctantly confirmed that he was abandoning his planned boxing comeback.

Life after boxing

Benn was entered into the World Boxing Council (WBC) Boxing Hall of Fame in 2013 and was honoured alongside fellow Brit Joe Calzaghe as the WBC's greatest super middleweight champion in history. His image is now enshrined upon the sixth generation WBC super middleweight belt.

Benn works with youth at risk in Blacktown, NSW and is dedicated to his charity work. He is an ambassador to the New South Wales Police Citizens Youth Club's (PCYC) and is an advocate for healthy living. Benn is also a Patron of the Shannon Bradshaw Trust, a UK children's charity based in the North West of England, helping children with life-threatening conditions and their families.

Benn ran the 2013 City to Surf to raise funds for the most underfunded PCYC gym in Redfern, Sydney and has undertaken many fund raisers for the charity since improving the boxing facilities in the most impoverished areas of Sydney. Benn regularly assists Christian groups, counselling individuals suffering from addiction and along with wife Carolyne counsels couples who are facing marriage issues.

One of Benn's sons, Conor Benn, turned professional in 2016 and is currently fighting at welterweight. Another son, Harley, turned professional in 2017.

Professional boxing record

References

External links

Recent interview with Nigel Benn (audio)

1964 births
Club DJs
English evangelicals
English Christians
English male boxers
English sportspeople of Barbadian descent
Living people
People from Ilford
Black British sportsmen
World Boxing Council champions
World Boxing Organization champions
Royal Regiment of Fusiliers soldiers
English expatriate sportspeople in Spain
England Boxing champions
Commonwealth Boxing Council champions
World middleweight boxing champions
World super-middleweight boxing champions
Boxers from Greater London
I'm a Celebrity...Get Me Out of Here! (British TV series) participants
Converts to Christianity
British blind people
Wheelchair users